Legacy of the Silver Shadow is an Australian children's television series that first aired on the Ten Network in 2002. The thirteen-part series follows the story of four children who help a dead superhero.

Legacy of the Silver Shadow was created by Chris Anastassiades and Ray Boseley, produced by Patricia Edgar; directed by Ray Boseley, Pino Amenta, Stephen Johnson and Julian McSwiney; and  written by Ray Boseley, Philip Dalkin, Robert Greenberg, Susan Macgillicuddy, David Devries, Stephen Bates, Christine Madafferi, Chris Anastassiades and Cameron Clarke.

Cast
 Aljin Abella as Campbell
 Sage Butler as Gretel
 Hannah Greenwood as Alex
 Alex Hopkins as Josh
 Eloise Mignon as Fiona
 Tayler Kane as Silver Shadow
 Ronald Faulk as The Crab
 Brendan Carroll as Feral
 Stephanie McIntosh as Samantha
 Melanie Dunn as Trudy
 Talia Zucker as Dina

See also 
 List of Australian television series

References

External links
 
 Legacy of the Silver Shadow at the Australian Television Information Archive
 Legacy of the Silver Shadow at Screen Australia 
 Legacy of the Silver Shadow at Australian Children's Television Foundation

Network 10 original programming
Australian children's television series
2002 Australian television series debuts
2002 Australian television series endings
English-language television shows